Olgica Arsova (born 25 November 1995) is a Macedonian footballer who plays as a goalkeeper for Kamenica Sasa. She has been a member of the Macedonia women's national team.

References

1995 births
Living people
Women's association football goalkeepers
Macedonian women's footballers
North Macedonia women's international footballers
ŽFK Kamenica Sasa players